Pritzerbe station is a railway station in the municipality of Pritzerbe, located in the Potsdam-Mittelmark district in Brandenburg, Germany.

Notable places nearby
Pritzerbe Ferry
Pritzerbe Lake

References

Railway stations in Brandenburg
Buildings and structures in Potsdam-Mittelmark